Ligny-en-Barrois is a commune in the Meuse department in Grand Est in north-eastern France.

The town is in the arrondissement of Bar-le-Duc, beside the canal that links the rivers Rhine and Marne, fifteen kilometres to the south east of Bar-le-Duc:  it is the administrative seat of the canton Ligny-en-Barrois. The population comprises 4,018 inhabitants (2019) and the area of Ligny is 32.26 km². The inhabitants are called in French Linéens.

A principal employer is the French Evobus motor bus assembly plant. Ligny is also the home town of the Essilor company which specialises in ophthalmic lens production.

Population

Twin towns – sister cities
Ligny-en-Barrois is twinned with:

  Aichtal, Germany (1998)

See also
Communes of the Meuse department

References

Lignyenbarrois
Duchy of Bar